Humnabad Assembly seat is one of the seats in Karnataka Legislative Assembly in India. It is a part (segment) of Bidar Lok Sabha seat.

Members of Assembly

Hyderabad State
 1951 (Seat-1): Srinivas Rao, Indian National Congress
 1951 (Seat-2): Shanker Dev, Indian National Congress

Mysore State
 1957: Murlidhar Rao, Indian National Congress

 1962: Gopal Rao Mudbi, Indian National Congress

 1967: V. N. Patil Neelappa, Communist Party of India

 1972: V. N. Patil Neelappa, Communist Party of India

Karnataka State
 1978:	Basawaraj Hawgeppa Patil, Janata Party

 1983:	Basawaraj Hawgeppa Patil, Indian National Congress

 1985:	Basawaraj Hawgeppa Patil, Indian National Congress

 1989:	Basawaraj Hawgeppa Patil, Indian National Congress

 1994:	Merajuddin Patel, Janata Dal

 1999:	Subhas Kallur, Bharatiya Janata Party

 2003 (by-Poll): Rajashekhar Basavaraj Patil, Indian National Congress

 2004:	Merajuddin Patel, Janata Dal (Secular)

 2008:	Rajashekhar Basavaraj Patil, Indian National Congress

 2013:	Rajashekhar Basavaraj Patil, Indian National Congress

 2018: Rajashekhar Basavaraj Patil, Indian National Congress

See also 
 List of constituencies of Karnataka Legislative Assembly

References 

Assembly constituencies of Karnataka
Bidar district